Sarbiewo  is a village in the administrative district of Gmina Baboszewo, within Płońsk County, Masovian Voivodeship, in east-central Poland.

The village has a population of 200.

On February 24, 1595 Maciej Kazimierz Sarbiewski, Polish author and most prominent Latin poet born here (d. 1640). 

In Sarbiewo take place International Days of Maciej Kazimierz Sarbiewski, SI - festival of poetry.

References

External links 
International Days of Maciej Kazimierz Sarbiewski - Academia Europea Sarbieviana

Sarbiewo